Sebastian Selke (born 22 February 1974) is a German former professional footballer who played as a goalkeeper.

References

External links
 

Living people
1974 births
German footballers
Association football goalkeepers
Lüneburger SK players
1. FC Köln players
KFC Uerdingen 05 players
VfL Bochum II players
2. Bundesliga players
German football managers
FC Vaduz managers